The Women's 1,500 metres event at the 2003 Pan American Games took place on Thursday August 7, 2003. Cuba's winner Adriana Muñoz set a national record in the final, clocking 4:09.57.

Medalists

Records

Results

See also
2003 World Championships in Athletics – Women's 1500 metres
Athletics at the 2004 Summer Olympics – Women's 1500 metres

Notes

References
Results

1,500 metres, Women's
2003
2003 in women's athletics